Dir zuliebe is a 1944 German comedy film directed by Martin Frič.

Cast
 Hans Holt as Martin Mansfeld
 Winnie Markus as Maria Mansfeld - seine Frau
 Clementia Egies as Magda - ihre Schwester
 Richard Häussler as Lorenz von Niel
 Erika von Thellmann as Mama Korb
 Paul Kemp as Karl Sinn
 Ernst Legal
 Hermine Ziegler
 Charlotta Tremlová as Singer

References

External links
 

1944 films
1944 comedy films
German comedy films
Films of Nazi Germany
1940s German-language films
German black-and-white films
Films directed by Martin Frič
1940s German films